The 1977 New York Yankees season was the 75th season for the Yankees. The team won the World Series, which was the 21st title in franchise history and the first under the ownership of George Steinbrenner. New York was managed by Billy Martin, and played at Yankee Stadium in The Bronx. The season was brought to life years later in the book and drama-documentary, The Bronx is Burning. The Yankees also hosted the 1977 Major League Baseball All-Star Game. To date, this is the most recent time the All-Star Game host team has won the World Series the same year.

Offseason 
The Yankees signed Reggie Jackson to a five-year contract, totaling $2.96 million, on November 29, 1976. Upon arriving in New York, Jackson asked for uniform number 9, which he had worn in Oakland and Baltimore. However, that number was being worn by third baseman Graig Nettles. So, noting that then-all-time home run leader Hank Aaron had just retired, Jackson asked for and received number 44, Aaron's number.

Notable transactions 
 November 5, 1976: Jim Mason was drafted from the Yankees by the Toronto Blue Jays as the 30th pick in the 1976 MLB expansion draft.
 January 11, 1977: Willie McGee was drafted by the Yankees in the first round (15th pick) of the 1977 Major League Baseball draft (Secondary Phase) and he signed on June 6.
 January 20, 1977: Elliott Maddox and Rick Bladt were traded by the Yankees to the Baltimore Orioles for Paul Blair.
 February 17, 1977: Sandy Alomar Sr. was traded by the Yankees to the Texas Rangers for Brian Doyle, Greg Pryor and cash.
 March 26, 1977: Kerry Dineen was traded by the Yankees to the Philadelphia Phillies for Sergio Ferrer.

Regular season 
In the best-of-five League Championship Series (ALCS), they beat the Kansas City Royals in five games. In the World Series, New York defeated the Los Angeles Dodgers in six games.

Game log

Season standings

Record vs. opponents

Notable transactions 
 April 5: Oscar Gamble, LaMarr Hoyt, minor leaguer Bob Polinsky, and $200,000 were traded by the Yankees to the Chicago White Sox for Bucky Dent.
 April 27: Dock Ellis, Larry Murray, and Marty Perez were traded by the Yankees to the Oakland Athletics for Mike Torrez.
 August 2: The Yankees acquired Stan Thomas from the Seattle Mariners for future considerations.

Draft picks 
 June 7: 1977 Major League Baseball draft
Joe Lefebvre was selected by the Yankees in the third round, and signed on July 6.
Chuck Hensley was selected by the Yankees in the tenth round.
Chris Welsh was selected by the Yankees in the 21st round.

All-Star game 
Yankee Stadium hosted the All-Star Game on July 19, less than a week after the blackout. Four Yankees were in the game: Willie Randolph and Reggie Jackson were in the starting lineup at second base and right field, while relief pitcher Sparky Lyle and third baseman Graig Nettles were part of the roster as reserves. The National League defeated the American League 7–5.

Roster

Characters

Reggie Jackson 
Jackson's first season with the Yankees was a difficult one.  Although team owner George Steinbrenner and several players, most notably catcher and team captain Thurman Munson and outfielder Lou Piniella, were excited about his arrival, Martin was not. He had managed the Detroit Tigers in 1972 when Jackson's A's beat them in the league playoffs. Jackson was once quoted as saying of Martin, "I hate him, but if I played for him, I'd probably love him."

The relationship between Jackson and his new teammates was strained due to an interview with SPORT magazine writer Robert Ward. During spring training at the Yankees' camp in Fort Lauderdale, Florida, Jackson and Ward were having drinks at a nearby bar. Jackson's version of the story is that he noted that the Yankees had won the pennant the year before, but lost the World Series to the Reds, and suggested that they needed one thing more to win it all, and pointed out the various ingredients in his drink. Ward suggested that Jackson might be "the straw that stirs the drink." But when the story appeared in the May 1977 issue of SPORT, Ward quoted Jackson as saying, "This team, it all flows from me. I'm the straw that stirs the drink. Maybe I should say me and Munson, but he can only stir it bad."

Thurman Munson 
Thurman Munson was "uncharacteristically happy" about the team getting Jackson in large part because he believed he had received "a verbal agreement from Steinbrenner that, with the exception of Catfish Hunter (who'd signed a five-year, $3.75 million contract with the Yankees before the 1975 season), he [Munson] would always be the highest-paid player on the team."  But, Steinbrenner did not follow through and adjust Munson's contract upward.  As the baseball book Stars and Strikes: Baseball and America in the Bicentennial Summer of ‘76 puts it, "But the Yankee captain wouldn't be smiling for long, once he realized that Steinbrenner had no intention of making good on their agreement."

An article in The New York Times in January 1977 reported, "Munson, however, has continued to be disturbed with Steinbrenner because of what he said first was the owner's denial of any verbal agreement and secand [second] was Steinbrenner's misleading him on Jackson's salary."

Billy Martin 
Martin feuded publicly with both Yankee owner Steinbrenner and star outfielder Jackson. In one especially infamous incident on Saturday, June 18, in the second game of a three-game sweep by the Boston Red Sox at Fenway Park, Martin pulled Jackson off the field in mid-inning for failing to hustle on a check-swing pop double by Boston's Jim Rice. Replaced in right field by Paul Blair, Jackson confronted Martin when he returned to the dugout, and Martin had to be restrained by his coaches (Elston Howard and Yogi Berra) from fighting with Jackson during the nationally-televised Game of the Week.

In popular culture 
Jonathan Mahler wrote a bestselling book entitled Ladies and Gentlemen, The Bronx Is Burning about the turmoil in New York City in 1977, including the Son of Sam, the blackout, and how Yankees season rallied the people of New York.  The book was adapted for an ESPN miniseries, The Bronx Is Burning

Player stats

Batting

Starters by position 
Note: Pos = Position; G = Games played; AB = At bats; H = Hits; Avg. = Batting average; HR = Home runs; RBI = Runs batted in

Other batters 
Note: G = Games played; AB = At bats; H = Hits; Avg. = Batting average; HR = Home runs; RBI = Runs batted in

Pitching

Starting pitchers 
Note: G = Games pitched; IP = Innings pitched; W = Wins; L = Losses; ERA = Earned run average; SO = Strikeouts

Other pitchers 
Note: G = Games pitched; IP = Innings pitched; W = Wins; L = Losses; ERA = Earned run average; SO = Strikeouts

Relief pitchers 
Note: G = Games pitched; IP = Innings pitched; W = Wins; L = Losses; SV = Saves; ERA = Earned run average; SO = Strikeouts

ALCS

Game 1 
October 5: Yankee Stadium, New York City

Game 2 
October 6: Yankee Stadium, New York City

Game 3 
October 7: Royals Stadium, Kansas City, Missouri

Game 4 
October 8: Royals Stadium, Kansas City, Missouri

Game 5 
October 9: Royals Stadium, Kansas City, Missouri

World Series

Awards and honors 
 Reggie Jackson, Babe Ruth Award
 Reggie Jackson, World Series MVP
 Sparky Lyle, Cy Young Award
 Graig Nettles, Gold Glove, third base

All-Stars 
All-Star Game

 Jackson, Lyle, Thurman Munson, Graig Nettles, and Willie Randolph represented the Yankees at All-Star Game at Yankee Stadium.

Farm system

LEAGUE CHAMPIONS: West Haven, Oneonta

Notes

References
1977 New York Yankees at Baseball Reference
1977 World Series
1977 New York Yankees at Baseball Almanac

New York Yankees seasons
New York Yankees
New York Yankees
1970s in the Bronx
American League East champion seasons
American League champion seasons
World Series champion seasons